Electronic Attack Squadron 131 (VAQ-131), also known as the "Lancers," is a United States Navy tactical jet aircraft squadron specializing in kinetic and non-kinetic Suppression of Enemy Air Defenses (SEAD). They are based at Naval Air Station Whidbey Island, flying the EA-18G Growler. Their radio callsign is "Skybolt."

History

VP-931
VAQ-131 was originally established as Patrol Squadron 931 (VP-931). From 1946 through 1955, VP-931 flew the P2V Neptune.

VAH-4
In 1956, the squadron transitioned to the A-3 Skywarrior and was redesignated as Heavy Attack Squadron 4 (VAH-4).

During the Vietnam War detachments from VAH-4 were deployed on the following aircraft carriers operating on Yankee and Dixie Stations:
 
28 January-21 November 1964, Detachment E A-3Bs were embarked on 
21 October 1964 – 29 May 1965, Detachment L A-3Bs were embarked on 
10 May-13 December 1965, Detachment 62 A-3Bs were embarked on 
28 September 1965 – 13 May 1966, Detachment B A-3Bs were embarked on 
19 October 1965 – 13 June 1966, Detachment C A-3Bs were embarked on  On 12 April 1966 the People's Republic of China claimed to have shot down a U.S. aircraft over the Leizhou Peninsula. The aircraft was identified as being squadron KA-3B #142653 which disappeared en route from Naval Air Station Cubi Point to the Kitty Hawk with four crewmen onboard.
26 October 1965 – 21 June 1966, Detachment M A-3Bs were embarked on 
29 May-16 November 1966, Detachment G A-3Bs were embarked on 
15 October 1966 – 29 May 1967, Detachment E A-3Bs were embarked on USS Ticonderoga
5 November 1966 – 19 June 1967, Detachment C KA-3Bs were embarked on USS Kitty Hawk
5 January-22 July 1967, Detachment B A-3Bs were embarked on 
26 January-25 August 1967, Detachment 31 A-3Bs were embarked on USS Bon Homme Richard
16 June 1967 – 31 January 1968, Detachment G/34 KA-3Bs were embarked on USS Oriskany
18 November 1967 – 28 June 1968, Detachment 63 KA-3Bs were embarked on USS Kitty Hawk
28 December 1967 – 17 August 1968, Detachment 14 KA-3Bs were embarked on USS Ticonderoga

In addition to the carrier deployments, in 1966 a detachment of KA-3Bs was also sent to operate from NAS Cubi Point and Da Nang Air Base.

VAQ-131

In November 1968, VAH-4 received the EKA-3 version of the Skywarrior and was redesignated as Tactical Electronic Warfare Squadron 131 (VAQ-131). In 1971, they became the second squadron in the U.S. Navy to receive the Standard version of the EA-6B Prowler. The squadron transitioned to the Expanded Capability (EXCAP) version of the Prowler in 1976, to the Improved Capablility (ICAP) Prowler in 1978, and to the ICAP II Prowler in 1984. In May 2014, they transitioned to the Boeing EA-18G Growler, which they currently operate. The EA-18G expanded the squadron's capabilities to enable more effective prosecution of radar and Surface-to-Air Missile (SAM) sites in an Integrated Air Defense System (IADS), both through air-to-ground weapon employment and precision electronic attack, the latter being the Growler's niche capability.  The EA-18G is also a capable air-to-air combat platform.

Home port assignments
The squadron was assigned to these home ports:
NAS Whidbey Island

Aircraft assignment
P-2V Neptune
A-3B/KA-3B/EKA-3 Skywarrior
EA-6B Prowler
EA-18G Growler

References

External links
VAQ-131 official website

See also
 History of the United States Navy
 List of United States Navy aircraft squadrons

Electronic attack squadrons of the United States Navy
Military units and formations in Washington (state)